Carposina achroana is a moth of the family Carposinidae. It was first described by Edward Meyrick in 1883. It is endemic to the island of Hawaii.

References

Carposinidae
Endemic moths of Hawaii